Andries Cornelis Dirk "André" Boerstra (December 11, 1924 – March 17, 2016) was a Dutch field hockey player who competed in the 1948 Summer Olympics and in the 1952 Summer Olympics. He was born in Bandoeng, Dutch East Indies. In 1948 he was a member of the Dutch field hockey team, which won the bronze medal. He played all seven matches as forward. Four years later he won the silver medal as part of the Dutch team. He played all three matches as forward.

External links
 
 Dutch Olympic Committee
André Boerstra's profile at databaseOlympics
André Boerstra's obituary 

1924 births
2016 deaths
Dutch male field hockey players
Olympic field hockey players of the Netherlands
Field hockey players at the 1948 Summer Olympics
Field hockey players at the 1952 Summer Olympics
Olympic silver medalists for the Netherlands
Olympic bronze medalists for the Netherlands
Sportspeople from Bandung
Olympic medalists in field hockey
Medalists at the 1952 Summer Olympics
Medalists at the 1948 Summer Olympics
20th-century Dutch people